Atypical anorexia nervosa is an eating disorder in which individuals meet all the qualifications for anorexia nervosa, including a body image disturbance and a history of restrictive eating and weight loss, except that they are not currently underweight. Atypical anorexia qualifies as a mental health disorder in the Diagnostic and Statistical Manual of Mental Disorders (DSM-5), under the category Other Specified Feeding and Eating Disorders (OSFED). The characteristics of people with atypical anorexia generally do not differ significantly from anorexia nervosa patients except for their current weight.

Atypical anorexia was not described in earlier editions of the DSM, which included a requirement that person to have a body weight no higher than 85% of normal. Patients with atypical anorexia were diagnosed with the DSM-4 qualification "eating disorder not otherwise specified" (EDNOS) until the DSM-5 was released in 2013. Prior to DSM-5, EDNOS made up the majority of eating disorders diagnoses, making it difficult to estimate the prevalence of atypical anorexia during this period. The term atypical anorexia was historically used to describe the restrictive eating habits of some people with autism. The DSM-5 superseded this term with the avoidant restrictive food intake disorder (ARFID) diagnosis.

This wikipedia article will include information on the signs and symptoms, treatment, diagnosis, prognosis, and epidemiology of atypical anorexia nervosa.

Signs and Symptoms 
Many of the physical symptoms of atypical anorexia nervosa are due to the effects of decreased caloric intake which causes the body to significantly suppress the metabolic rate. The body's decreased metabolic rate is a response to stress and causes widespread symptoms that affect many of the organ systems as the body is attempting to adjust to its malnourished state. This causes hypo metabolic symptoms such as chronic fatigue, bradycardia, and amenorrhea. Bradycardia and orthostatic instability are frequent and life-threatening complications that account for the majority of medical hospitalizations in atypical anorexia nervosa. 

Physical Symptoms

- Amenorrhea

- Rapid, continuous weight loss

- Bradycardia

- Orthostatic instability

- Chronic fatigue

- Halitosis

- Hypotension

- Slowed gastric emptying

- Insomnia

- Anemia

- Yellowing and/or drying skin 

While patients have many similar physical symptoms, there are physical symptoms that may be absent or less frequent in atypical anorexia nervosa as compared to typical anorexia nervosa such as lanugo hair. These symptoms often are attributed to low body weight which is not seen in atypical anorexia nervosa. 

Psychiatric/Cognitive Symptoms

- Intense fear of gaining weight or becoming fat

- Disturbance in the way in which one’s body weight or shape is experienced, undue influence of body weight or shape on self-evaluation. 

- Obsessive and compulsive symptoms

- Anxiety

- Depression

- Somatization

- Social phobia

It is common for patients with atypical anorexia nervosa to have co-morbid psychiatric disorders such as depression, anxiety, and OCD. Depressive and anxious disorders account for the majority of the comorbid disorders seen in association with atypical anorexia nervosa. However, there are limited studies on the prevalence of psychiatric illness in atypical anorexia nervosa.

Treatment 
The methodologies used by eating disorder treatment centers to treat anorexia nervosa generally also help those affected by atypical anorexia. Re-feeding and addressing any possible electrolyte imbalances is usually the first step in treating atypical anorexia nervosa, as complications from underlying electrolyte imbalances and malnutrition can be fatal. A calorie range of 1000-1400 kcal is recommended when first starting treatment for anorexia nervosa or atypical anorexia nervosa as the patient's body might not be accustomed to a higher caloric range. It is recommended that they are treated in an inpatient facility and slowly adjusted to increased calorie intake by 100-200 additional calories per day. In addition to addressing malnutrition, healthy, moderate weight gain is the goal of early treatment and the patient should be monitored for a lack of weight gain or rapid weight gain which can indicate re-feeding syndrome.

Treatment may also include a variety of therapies that help a patient deal with the depression, anxiety, and other mental symptoms that arise from the eating disorder. In addition to addressing caloric intake and malnutrition, psychological treatment of patients is vital to treatment of atypical anorexia nervosa. Psychotherapy including cognitive behavioral therapy, dialectical behavioral therapy, and interpersonal therapy are used frequently in the treatment of atypical anorexia nervosa. However, only family therapy has shown real efficacy in treating patients with anorexia nervosa and atypical anorexia nervosa. Overall, studies on the efficacy of psychotherapy in atypical anorexia nervosa are limited at this time. 

Psychiatric medications are used as an adjunct to mainstay treatments of atypical anorexia nervosa and have limited efficacy in the treatment of this disease. In anorexia nervosa, patients who are severely malnourished see very little improvement with selective serotonin reuptake inhibitors (SSRIs) and no studies have indicated improvement in atypical anorexia nervosa with SSRIs. Due to this, SSRIs have a limited role in the treatment of atypical anorexia nervosa. 

In the US, treatment may be complicated by the need to get health insurance plans to pay.  Medical coding may be incorrect on requests or may be rejected because payers incorrectly evaluated it under the separate criteria for anorexia nervosa.

Diagnosis 
The diagnosis of atypical anorexia nervosa is carried out by a licensed health practitioner based on a clinical assessment which includes physical, psychiatric, and behavioral symptoms.

DSM-5 Criteria 
The diagnostic criteria used to diagnose psychiatric conditions are found in the Diagnostic and Statistical Manual of Mental Disorders (DSM) published by the American Psychiatric Association. The DSM-5 is the most current revision of the manual which was updated in 2013 to include atypical anorexia nervosa. This update addressed problems pointed out by the psychiatric community that the eating disorder section of the DSM-4 did not properly address the segment of patients who met many of the criteria of typical anorexia nervosa but did not meet the weight requirement of typical anorexia nervosa. Many of these patients were left without a specific diagnosis while dealing with an eating disorder that did not fit any criteria. Due to this, the DSM-5 included descriptions of disorders that did not meet criteria but created significant impairment in a patient's daily life. These disorders are found in the "Other specified feeding or eating disorders" or OSFED. 

According to the DSM-5, in the "Other specified feeding or eating disorders", atypical anorexia nervosa is defined as "all of the criteria for anorexia nervosa are met, except that despite significant weight loss, the individual's weight is within or above the normal range." There is no consensus in the psychiatric community about what constitutes "significant weight loss" and there are calls from the psychiatric community that this be researched and addressed in subsequent DSM publications.

Prognosis 
Anorexia nervosa is one of the most difficult psychiatric disorders to treat and has a high mortality rate due to complications from malnutrition and suicide. Currently there are no specific studies completed on the prognosis of atypical anorexia nervosa. However, the current consensus is that it is similar to, if not worse, than that of anorexia nervosa. One study looked at the length of duration of individual episodes seen in patients and found atypical anorexia nervosa had an 11.2 month duration as compared to anorexia nervosa with an 8 month duration. Overall, the remission rates of atypical anorexia nervosa and anorexia nervosa are similar at 71% for atypical anorexia nervosa and 75% for anorexia nervosa. 

The current consensus is that atypical anorexia patients are at risk for many of the same medical complications of anorexia nervosa. Evidence from a study conducted at the University of California San Francisco Eating Disorders Program suggests that atypical anorexia patients are equally likely as anorexia nervosa patients to develop secondary side effects related to decreased caloric and nutritional intake, including bradycardia (decreased heart rate), amenorrhea (stopping of the menstrual period), and electrolyte imbalances.

Epidemiology 
It is difficult to gauge the true prevalence of atypical anorexia pre-2013 because patients were lumped together under the EDNOS diagnosis. Evidence suggests that atypical anorexia is more prevalent than anorexia nervosa, but individuals experiencing it are less likely to receive care. For example, one prospective study of 196 women found a prevalence of 2.8% for atypical anorexia, compared to only 0.8% for anorexia nervosa by the age of 20. However, individuals experiencing atypical anorexia nervosa are less likely to receive care. In addition, when these individuals do receive care, there is a higher rate of treatment dropout and decreased treatment response. This can be attributed to a number of reasons including less stigma surrounding atypical anorexia nervosa due to patients in the normal or overweight range, as well as the perception of patients that the severity of their eating disorder is low because of their weight range.

References 

Anorexia nervosa